|}

The King George VI Chase is a Grade 1 National Hunt steeplechase in Great Britain which is open to horses aged four years or older. It is run at Kempton Park over a distance of about 3 miles (4,828 metres), and during its running there are eighteen fences to be jumped. The race is scheduled to take place each year on 26 December, and features as part of the course's Christmas Festival.

The event was first run in February 1937, and it was named in honour of the new British monarch, King George VI. It was only run twice before World War II, during which Kempton Park was closed for racing and used as a prisoner-of-war camp. The two pre-war runnings were each contested by four horses. The winner of the first, Southern Hero, remains the race's oldest ever winner. After the war the racecourse re-opened, and the event returned in 1947 on a new date – Boxing Day. 

The King George VI Chase is now the second most prestigious chase in England, surpassed only by the Cheltenham Gold Cup. Fifteen horses have won it more than once,  Desert Orchid won it four times and Kauto Star won it five times. The race is currently sponsored by the Ladbrokes Coral bookmaking firm.

Records
Most successful horse (5 wins):
 Kauto Star – 2006, 2007, 2008, 2009, 2011

Leading jockey (5 wins):
 Ruby Walsh – Kauto Star (2006, 2007, 2008, 2009, 2011)

Leading trainer (13 wins):
 Paul Nicholls – See More Business (1997, 1999), Kauto Star (2006, 2007, 2008, 2009, 2011), Silviniaco Conti (2013, 2014), Clan Des Obeaux (2018, 2019), Frodon (2020), Bravemansgame (2022)

Winners

See also
 Horse racing in Great Britain
 List of British National Hunt races

References

 Glasgow Herald
 Racing Post:

 kinggeorgechase.com – King George Chase Winners.
 pedigreequery.com – King George VI Chase – Kempton Park.

External links
 Race Recordings 

National Hunt races in Great Britain
Kempton Park Racecourse
National Hunt chases
Recurring events established in 1937
December sporting events
Boxing Day
1937 establishments in England